Vacco v. Quill, 521 U.S. 793 (1997), was a landmark decision of the Supreme Court of the United States regarding the right to die. It ruled 9-0 that a New York ban on physician-assisted suicide was constitutional, and preventing doctors from assisting their patients, even those terminally ill and/or in great pain, was a legitimate state interest that was well within the authority of the state to regulate. In brief, this decision established that, as a matter of law, there was no constitutional guarantee of a "right to die."

Background
The State of New York had enacted a prohibition against physician-assisted suicide, making it a crime for a physician to administer lethal medication or to otherwise knowingly and intentionally end the life of a patient, even a consenting, mentally competent, and terminally ill patient. 

A number of physicians (here the respondents) filed suit against New York's Attorney General, in the United States District Court for the Southern District of New York, challenging the law on constitutional grounds. The respondents argued that the statute violated the Equal Protection Clause of the Fourteenth Amendment, noting that a patient, while still enjoying the right to refuse treatment when terminally ill, did not enjoy the right to authorize a doctor to end their life. In effect, the respondents argued that refusing treatment and requesting that their doctor assist them in ending their life were "the same thing."

The District Court ruled in favor of the New York statute. In its decision, the court stated that the State of New York had a rational, legitimate interest in preserving life and protecting vulnerable persons; as such, the law was not unconstitutional. The District Court said that this was a matter of legislation, and, if the ban were to be repealed, it would take an act of New York's legislature (or a binding referendum by the voters) to do so. 

The United States Court of Appeals for the Second Circuit reversed the District Court's judgment. The Appeals Court reasoned that, even though the law itself applied as a general rule to all persons, a fact that the District Court noted in determining its constitutionality, it did not treat all competent patients equally when they were near death and wished to end their lives. To this effect, the Appeals Court said that, for example, a patient attached to a life support device was allowed to require its removal, while a person under identical circumstances could not demand that a doctor administer drugs to ensure the patient's death. It agreed with the contention that removing life support devices was identical to requesting physician-assisted euthanasia, and thereby reversed the lower court's finding. 

The Supreme Court of the United States granted certiorari, hearing arguments on January 8, 1997.

Supreme Court decision
On June 26, 1997, the Supreme Court issued six different opinions in a unanimous (9-0) decision. The majority opinion was authored by Chief Justice Rehnquist, and was joined by Justices O'Connor, Scalia, Kennedy, and Thomas. Justice O'Connor wrote a concurring opinion, joined in part by Justices Ginsburg and Breyer. Justices Stevens, Souter, Ginsburg, and Breyer filed separate concurring opinions. 

The Court began its opinion by stating that the New York law did not infringe upon a fundamental right. In this line of reasoning, the Court referenced San Antonio School District v. Rodriguez, which said, in relevant part, that the judiciary must look to the Constitution, rather than to the stated "importance" of a right, when determining whether that right was, indeed, fundamental. Because New York's ban did not infringe upon a fundamental right, and because respondents were not claiming that the "right to die" was fundamental, the Court reiterated its policy of according such laws a great deal of leeway. In the Court's own words, from Heller v. Doe, laws such as those enacted by New York were entitled to a "strong presumption of validity."

After addressing the matter of fundamental rights, the Court delineated the rationale behind its decision. It first turned to the long-standing legal tradition of looking to a person's intent as a way of distinguishing between two acts with identical physical consequences. For example, a person who accidentally kills a pedestrian while blinded by the sun might only face punishment for vehicular manslaughter, while a person who intentionally and purposefully kills another with his car could be punished for murder. While these two acts give the same results, they are distinguished by the intent of the actors. 

The Court applied the standard of intent to the matter at hand, finding that a doctor who withdraws life support at the request of his patient intends only to respect his patient's wishes. This, the Court said, is a sharp contrast to the doctor who honors a patient's request to end their life, which necessarily requires more than an intent to respect their wishes; namely, it requires the intent to kill the patient. A major difference, the Court determined, in the two scenarios is that the former may cause the patient to die from underlying causes, while the latter will cause the patient to die by the hands of the physician. To this effect the Court quoted a House Judiciary Committee hearing, stating that a physician performing an assisted suicide, "must, necessarily and indubitably, intend primarily that the patient be made dead." Furthermore, in another repudiation of the respondents' argument, the Court noted that a patient removing life support might not actually intend to die, and that death without such a device may not be a certainty.

Looking to New York's intent behind the ban, the Court noted that the law plainly recognized the difference between "killing" and "letting die." It also recognized that the State of New York had, as a matter of policy, a compelling interest in forbidding assisted suicide, while allowing a patient to refuse life support was simply an act of protecting a common-law right. This right was not, contrary to the Court of Appeals' view, the "right to hasten death"; rather, the Court declared that it was the right to retain bodily integrity and to preserve individual autonomy. The prevention of "unwanted touching" was, the Court said, a very legitimate right to protect. 

In closing, the Court said that it fully rejected the respondents' argument that the statutory difference between assisted suicide and refusing lifesaving treatment was "arbitrary" and "irrational." It did concede that there were probably incidents where the two were likely to have the same result, but also said that such an argument was beside the point. The Court declared that New York "obviously" had a number of legitimate, compelling, and rational interests in enacting this ban. However, regardless of these reasons, it determined simply that the law permitted everyone to refuse treatment and prohibited everyone from assisting suicide; as such, the law did not run afoul of the Equal Protection Clause and the state had the constitutional authority to put such a law into place.

O'Connor's concurrence
Justice O'Connor joined the Court's decision. She accepted the contention that there was neither a "right to commit suicide" nor a "right to die," as such. She did not, however, think that the Court needed to consider the conflict beyond rejecting the facial challenges to the statute. Justice O'Connor stated that, in the context of the questions presented in this case, the Court did not need to address whether a patient had a constitutionally cognizable interest in controlling the circumstances of his or her imminent death." The statute, she claimed, was constitutional on its face, because the state had interests - such as protecting those who are not truly competent or facing imminent death or whose decisions would not be genuinely voluntary - of such gravity as to validate its legislation in pursuit of these interests. She said there was no constitutional conflict here; a patient was free to seek pain-relieving medication from their doctor, even at risk of health, to alleviate suffering, and this was a constitutionally acceptable alternative to permit in the absence of legalized assisted suicide. Justice O'Connor went on to say that, because everyone will face suffering of this kind (be it to themselves or a loved one), she had faith in the democratic process to strike an appropriate balance. In short, the law was up to the people of New York to decide.

Stevens' concurrence
Justice Stevens joined the Court's decision. He stated, though, that he issued a separate opinion only to clarify his belief that there was the possibility of further debate on the constitutional limitations of a state's ability to punish assisted suicide. As the second-most senior Justice on the Court (after Chief Justice Rehnquist), it is likely that Stevens would have written the opinion himself had Rehnquist not elected to do so. This much is suggested by the length of Stevens' concurrence which runs several pages (official format) longer than Rehnquist's opinion. It is possible that the Chief Justice was in part persuaded to exercise this ability by the fact that Stevens' concurrence offers a less concrete view of the state's ability to regulate euthanasia than the majority of the Justices seem to support.

Stevens notes that the Court construed the challenge to the statute as one of facial validity; i.e., that the respondents asserted that the law was invalid in all or most cases it might be applied. This type of challenge, he noted, is very difficult to argue successfully, because the challenger must show that the prohibited action is constitutionally protected. Applied to this case, the Court required that it be demonstrated that the Fourteenth Amendment included a right to commit suicide, and that such right included the right to receive assistance in doing so. Stevens agreed with the Court in rejecting this idea, believing that "liberty" as defined by the Due Process Clause didn't include such a right, because "The value to others of a person's life is far too precious to allow the individual to claim a constitutional entitlement to complete autonomy in making a decision to end that life."

In spite of this, however, Stevens said that the debate did not necessarily end there. He noted that the Supreme Court had found capital punishment to be constitutionally permissible, but had later also said that it could potentially be impermissibly cruel. As such, simply deciding that a certain statute outlawing assisted suicide was constitutional did not mean that every possible application would be likewise. He stated that he believed that a state had a compelling interest in preventing suicide prompted by depression or coercion; however, this interest does not apply when people are competent to make decisions and who are not being coerced or abused into decision. 

Stevens also rejected the argument, raised by the petitioners, that permitting physician-assisted suicide would taint the perception of the doctor/patient relationship. In some cases, he argued, a doctor's refusal to hasten death could be perceived as an act contrary to the doctor's role of healer. In cases such as these, he believed that the relationship would not be hindered by permitting the doctor to aid in the patient's demise. 

To conclude his opinion, Stevens stated once more that he agreed with the majority finding, and that the rationale in the decision was well founded. However, he drew a distinction between finding a law generally acceptable and finding it acceptable in all cases. While agreeing in principle, he noted that there could be some instances where the law unjustly infringed upon a patient's personal liberty.

Souter's concurrence
Justice Souter issued a short clarifying concurrence, noting that he agreed with the ruling, but also stressing that he felt the claims raised were significant enough to warrant further justification. He cited his own concurrence in Washington v. Glucksberg , reiterating that he felt the distinction between the permitted refusal of treatment and the prohibited assisted suicide was not an arbitrary one.

Breyer's concurrence
Justice Breyer issued a joint concurrence with this case and Washington v. Glucksberg. He stated that he agreed that the distinction the law made between the practices in question was justified and rational. However, he thought that the majority erred both by stating that the respondents asserted a "right to commit suicide with another's assistance" and by stating that the right to choose one's manner of death was not fundamental. Justice Breyer felt it would be more appropriate to consider a "right to die with dignity." Regardless of the semantics, Breyer's primary disagreement with the Court was his belief that it need not, and should not, have deemed whether such a right would be fundamental. He believed that there could be cases in the future with similar yet substantially different circumstances in which the Court may be forced to reconsider the terms used in this decision.

Ginsburg's concurrence
Justice Ginsburg also issued a joint concurrence with this case and Washington v. Glucksberg. She stated that her reasoning largely mirrored that used by Justice O'Connor.

See also
Right to die#United States
List of United States Supreme Court cases, volume 521
 List of United States Supreme Court cases
 Lists of United States Supreme Court cases by volume

External links

United States Supreme Court cases
United States Supreme Court cases of the Rehnquist Court
United States equal protection case law
1997 in United States case law
Assisted suicide
Assisted suicide in the United States
Euthanasia law